Wanda Koczeska (17 February 1937 – 15 December 2008) was a Polish actress. She appeared in twenty-one films and television shows between 1959 and 2008.

Selected filmography
 Innocent Sorcerers (1960)

References

External links

1937 births
2008 deaths
Polish film actresses
Actresses from Warsaw